Paremhat 24 - Coptic Calendar - Paremhat 26

The twenty-fifth day of the Coptic month of Paremhat, the seventh month of the Coptic year. In common years, this day corresponds to March 21, of the Julian Calendar, and April 3, of the Gregorian Calendar. This day falls in the Coptic Season of Shemu, the season of the Harvest.

Commemorations

Apostles 

 The martyrdom of Saint Onesiphorous, one of the Seventy Apostles
 The departure of Saint Prisca, one of the Seventy Apostles

Saints 

 The departure of Pope Matthew III, the 100th Patriarch of the See of Saint Mark

References 

Days of the Coptic calendar